Coccotrypes advena is a species in the family Curculionidae ("snout and bark beetles"), in the order Coleoptera ("beetles"). A common name for Coccotrypes advena is "seed borer".
Coccotrypes advena probably originates from Southeast Asia, but is now found in North America.

References

Further reading

External links

Scolytinae
Beetles of Asia
Beetles of North America
Beetles described in 1894